Bobby Lee Bonds Jr. (born March 7, 1970) is an American former minor-league baseball player. He is the son of former baseball player Bobby Bonds and the younger brother of Barry Bonds and Ricky Bonds. After high school, he went to Cañada College to play baseball. He was drafted in the 1992 June Amateur Draft.

Baseball career 
Bonds moved up from Rookie League to Short Season A ball during his first year in professional baseball. In 1993, he moved up to Single A to play with the Waterloo Diamonds. In 1994, during one of the best seasons of his career, Bonds was promoted from A ball straight to AAA. He began the 1995 season in Advanced A and was traded to the San Francisco Giants organization, the club that Barry Bonds was on at the time. In 1998, Bobby started with the independent Sonoma County Crushers, then played for the Giants AA and AAA teams. Bonds spent the rest of his baseball career (1999–2002) with independent minor league teams.

On his brother's steroid case 
In a 2007, interview with the Star-Ledger, Bonds said that he doesn't know whether Barry used steroids and he said that Barry would never have admitted using them to him anyway. Bonds also criticized Hank Aaron, who had announced that he would not be present when Barry hit numbers 755 and 756.

References

External links 

His Brother's Big Footsteps - SI Vault
Bonds brothers in same outfield - Toledo Blade
Bonds' brother bothered by baseball snub - ESPN
Bonds’ brother upset with Aaron over snub - MSNBC
Diary of A Sports Writer

1970 births
Living people
African-American baseball players
Baseball players from California
Cañada Colts baseball players
21st-century African-American sportspeople
20th-century African-American sportspeople